Phillip Long (born May 16, 1983 in Oklahoma City, Oklahoma) is an American soccer midfielder who spent two seasons with the Carolina Railhawks of the USL First Division.

High school and college
He attended Hunt High School in Wilson, North Carolina, graduating in 2002. He was named the North Carolina Soccer Coaches Association's male soccer player of the year for 2001 (an award that was awarded in 1996 to his future teammate Caleb Norkus). He was also named a McDonald's High School All-American in soccer for the 2001-2002 season, being named the 2002 McDonald’s All American Games MVP.  He attended the University of Virginia where he played for the Cavaliers in 2002 to 2004. In 2002, he played in 14 games with 4 goals scored. In 2003, he played in 13 games with 1 goal scored.

Professional
In 2007, Long attended try outs with the expansion Carolina Railhawks of the USL First Division.  He impressed the coaches enough to be offered a contract and signed for the 2007 season. Long scored a goal in the team's first franchise win against MLS club Chivas USA.

References

External links
 Carolina RailHawks Player Profile

1983 births
Living people
American soccer players
Soccer players from Oklahoma
Association football midfielders
Sportspeople from Oklahoma City
Virginia Cavaliers men's soccer players
USL First Division players
North Carolina FC players